Fort Madison station might refer to the following stations in Fort Madison, Iowa:

Atchison, Topeka and Santa Fe Passenger and Freight Complex Historic District, the former Atchison, Topeka and Santa Fe Railway station and active Amtrak station from 2021 to the present
Fort Madison station (1968–2021), the former Atchison, Topeka and Santa Fe Railway replacement station and Amtrak station from 1968 to 2021